"The Heart That You Own" is a song written and recorded by American country music artist Dwight Yoakam.  It was released in April 1992 as the fifth single from his album If There Was a Way.  This song peaked at number 18 in the United States and at number 13 in Canada.

Music video
The music video was directed by Neil Abramson and premiered in early 1992.

Chart performance
"The Heart That You Own" debuted the U.S. Billboard Hot Country Singles & Tracks for the week of April 25, 1992.

References

1992 singles
Dwight Yoakam songs
Songs written by Dwight Yoakam
Song recordings produced by Pete Anderson
Reprise Records singles
1990 songs